is a feminine Japanese given name which is occasionally given to men.

Possible writings
Chinatsu can be written using different kanji characters and can mean:
千夏, "thousand summers/thousandth summer"
知夏, "wise summer"
智夏, "intellect, summer"
千菜津, "thousand vegetables, harbor"
智菜津, "intellect, vegetable, harbor"
The name can also be written in hiragana or katakana.

People
Chinatsu Akasaki (千夏), Japanese voice actress
Chinatsu Ban (知夏, born 1973), Japanese artist
Chinatsu Matsui (千夏, born 1977), Japanese squash player
Chinatsu Mori (千夏, 1980–2006), Japanese shot putter
Chinatsu Nakayama (千夏, born 1948),  Japanese voice actress, writer, and politician
Chinatsu Wakatsuki (千夏, born 1984), Japanese gravure idol and tarento
Chinatsu Kira (知夏, born 1991), Japanese football player

Characters
Chinatsu Aida (千夏), a supporting character in the Japanese TV drama Last Friends
Chinatsu Nakayama (千夏), a character in the four panel manga series Doki Doki School Hours
Chinatsu Gondo (千夏), a character in the 1994 film Godzilla vs. SpaceGodzilla
Chinatsu Tsuboi (千夏), a main character in the manga and live-action drama series Shomuni
Chinatsu Aramaki (千夏), a supporting character in the manga and anime series Maid Sama!
Chinatsu Yoshikawa (ちなつ), a main character in the manga and anime series YuruYuri
Chinatsu Hiyama (緋山 千夏), one of the main characters in the manga and anime series ballroom e youkoso
Chinatsu Kuramoto (千夏 ), a supporting character in the manga and anime series Flying Witch

Japanese feminine given names